Tukuma Ziņotājs is a regional newspaper published in Latvia.

Newspapers published in Latvia
Mass media in Tukums